Tainá: An Adventure in the Amazon is a Brazilian movie from 2000, of the infant-juvenile and adventure genre directed by Tânia Lamarca and Sérgio Bloch.

The film spawned a sequel and prequel, Tainá 2: A New Amazon Adventure and Tainá 3: The Origin, both released in 2004 and 2011.

Plot
The film tells the adventures of a young Indian orphan who lives with her grandfather, the wise old Tigê, in a corner of the Rio Negro in the Amazon. With Tigê, she learns the legends and stories of her people, living intimately with the forest and its animals.

Little by little, Tainá becomes a guardian of the forest and manages to save a little monkey from falling into the clutches of a trafficker. Nicknamed Catú, the new little friend becomes her companion after her grandfather's death.

Protected by an amulet left by Tigê, Tainá continues the fight in defense of the jungle.

Pursued by the trafficker, the guardian will stop in a small village where a biologist and her son Joninho live, who is following her mother in her scientific researches.

The agreement between them becomes difficult and Tainá decides to leave the village, but Joninho, who was already planning an "escape" to play a trick on his mother, follows her and now will have to learn from her how to survive in the forest.

Cast
Eunice Baía — Tainá
Caio Romei — Joninho
Ruy Polanah — Vô Tigê
Jairo Mattos — Rudi
Branca Camargo — Isabel
Alexandre Zacchia — Shoba
Luciana Rigueira — Tikiri
Charles Paraventi — Boca
Marcos Apolo — Biriba
Betty Erthal — Miss Meg
Luiz Carlos Tourinho — Mr. Smith
Nadine Voullièmevoz — Catú, the monkey (voice)
Guilherme Briggs — Ludo, the parrot (voice)
Alfonso Segura — Aida, the monkey (voice)
Jaqueline Arashida - Yemanjac

Release and reception

Release and awards
The film was awarded at the 2000 Christmas Film Festival in the categories best film and best photography (Marcelo Corpanni). In 2001, it also won the prize for best fiction film at the Rio Film Festival and at the Chicago International Children's Film Festival, and the prize for best photography direction at the Brazilian Film Festival in Miami. Tainá - Uma Aventura na Amazônia was launched in cinemas by Art Films and MAM distributors on January 12, 2001, in one hundred theaters, and was watched by 853,210 spectators, collecting 3,054,492 reais. In 2005, it was shown at the Marseille Festival, France.

Critical Reception
Rubens Ewald Filho praised the film saying that it is a "[a]dequate youth adventure" and also the "right choice of Miss Eunice Baía for the title role", and noted that it is "[r]eplet with ecological messages (it looks like a Tarzan [sic] film: every two minutes they close in some exotic animal)". However, he commented that "[it] is well capable of being better accepted abroad, where they are more concerned with the theme and the survival of our Amazon than here. Writing for the Cineclick website, Celso Sabadin said that the feature "has everything to please children and youth audiences, without annoying adults. The film is agile, dynamic, well assembled and brings beautiful images of the Amazon, very well photographed by Marcelo Corpanni". He also praised the dialogues, calling them "fun", and the protagonist's performance, which gave "more veracity and credibility to the story".

References

External links
 
 

2000s adventure comedy films
2000 films
Portuguese-language films
Tainá 1
Brazilian adventure films
Brazilian children's films
Environmental films
Indigenous cinema in Latin America
2000 comedy films